Obolidae is a family of extinct brachiopods.

Species
Obolidae species include:

Obolus apollinis Eichwald, 1829
Schmidtites celatus (Volborth, 1869)

References 

Brachiopod families
Lingulata